Bohdan Yermakov Alexandrovich (born 28 March 1985, in Troitske, Voroshilovgrad oblast, USSR) Ukrainian artist and poet. He is best known for his realistic rural landscapes.

Biography 
Bogdan Yermakov was born in the family of the artist and designer Yermakov Alexander Vyacheslavovich. From an early age, Bogdan loved drawing and often came to his father's workshop. His teachers and mentors were Ermakov A.V., Kovalchuk V.I. The master was engaged in self-development, a great influence on his painting had the artworks of Levitan, Monet, Aivazovsky, Clover. He graduated from the European School of Design, Kyiv in 2014. After the death of Alexander Yermakov (2000), Bogdan, tries to enter the Lugansk Art College and does not gain passing points. At 16, he moved to Boyarka, Kyiv region, where he continued to paint. From 2002 to 2012 he was engaged in architecture and design. In 2012, he returned to landscape painting.

Selected paintings 
Autumn Oak, 2017 — Boyarka Museum of Local Lore Boyarka. Ukrainian field, 2018 — Great Britain City of London. Slopes of the Dnieper in Lutezh, 2018 — Bulgaria city Sofia

Exhibitions 
2015 — UK/RAINE Competition for young artists from Ukraine and the UK (FIRTASH FOUNDATION), Kyiv.
SHOWER COLORS 2018 — supported by the embassy for Latvia, Central House of Artists, Kyiv.
FROM MALANKA TO JORDAN 2020 — Verkhovna Rada of Ukraine, Kyiv.

References

External links 
 585-hudozhnikov-uzhe-krasjat-jaica
 About-the-artist
 blog knute.edu.ua

Ukrainian genre painters
21st-century Ukrainian painters
21st-century Ukrainian male artists
Ukrainian male painters
1985 births
Living people